Easterhouse railway station serves the Easterhouse area of Glasgow, Scotland. It was built by the North British Railway as part of their Coatbridge Branch and opened when the branch opened on 1 February 1871. The station is 5¾ miles (9 km) east of Glasgow Queen Street railway station on the North Clyde Line and is managed by ScotRail.

Daily services
Monday to Saturday daytimes:

Half-hourly service towards Edinburgh Waverley
Half-hourly service towards Airdrie 
Half-hourly service towards Balloch via Glasgow Queen Street Low Level
Half-hourly service towards Helensburgh Central via Glasgow Queen Street Low Level (as of August 2016 this service no longer calls at Shettleston, Cartyne and Bellgrove. Passengers for these stations have to use the half-hourly service towards Balloch instead.)

Evening services are as follows: 
Half-hourly service towards Airdrie via all stations
Half-hourly service towards Balloch via Glasgow Queen Street Low Level

Sunday services are as follows: 
Half-hourly service towards Edinburgh Waverley 
Half-hourly service towards Helensburgh Central

Rolling stock

Previous operations

From the 1960s after electrification by British Railways, both Class 311s and Class 303s operated the North Clyde Lines. During the 1990s the Class 320s were introduced to the North Clyde Lines. The Class 311s were then withdrawn and both Class 303s and 320s operated together until 2002 when the final Class 303 unit was withdrawn. The Class 334s then entered service. Initially, the units were set for the Ayrshire Lines but they operated the North Clyde lines during peak-hour times.

References

Notes

Sources 

Railway stations in Glasgow
Former North British Railway stations
Railway stations in Great Britain opened in 1871
SPT railway stations
Railway stations served by ScotRail
Baillieston